Antonio Franco (born Puglianello, Italy, 24 March 1937) is a Vatican diplomat.

Biography 
He was born in Puglianello, Italy, on 24 March 1937. He was ordained a priest of Telese o Cerreto Sannita on 10 July 1960. To prepare for a diplomatic career he entered the Pontifical Ecclesiastical Academy in 1968.

He held various posts in diplomatic missions of the Holy See in Iran, France, Permanent Mission of the Holy See to the United Nations in New York and the Section for Relations with States of the Secretariat of State.

He was appointed titular archbishop of Gallesium and Apostolic Nuncio to Ukraine on 28 March 1992. He received his episcopal consecration from Pope John Paul II on 26 April. From 1993 to 1997, while Nuncio to Ukraine, he also served there as head of the new Apostolic Administration of Zakarpattia of Latini (later the Diocese of Mukacheve).

On 6 April 1999 he was appointed Apostolic Nuncio to the Philippines.

On 21 January 2006, Pope Benedict XVI appointed him Apostolic Nuncio to Israel and Cyprus as well as Apostolic Delegate to Jerusalem and Palestine, In April 2007, Franco threatened to boycott a Holocaust memorial ceremony at Yad Vashem because of the way the museum described Pope Pius XII's behavior toward the Jews during World War II. Franco relented saying he only meant to draw attention to the question and calling the dispute "only diplomacy". The museum’s plaque describing Pope Pius' activities was later modified. Franco also helped manage Pope Benedict’s visit to the Holy Land in May 2008, and he fostered discussions between religious communities and the Holy See and the regions’ governments. 

Franco retired from the diplomatic service in August 2012 but remained responsible for the dossier for negotiations between the Holy See and Israel regarding fiscal concerns, taxes and Church lands in Israel.

On 22 February 2013, he succeeded Archbishop Giuseppe De Andrea as the Assessor of the Order of the Holy Sepulchre.

As late as 2017, he continued to serve as a member of the Holy See's delegation to the Bilateral Permanent Working Commission between the Holy See and the State of Israel.

See also
 List of heads of the diplomatic missions of the Holy See

References

1937 births
Living people
People from the Province of Benevento
Roman Catholic titular archbishops
Apostolic Nuncios to the Philippines
Apostolic Nuncios to Ukraine
Apostolic Nuncios to Israel
Apostolic Nuncios to Cyprus
Pontifical Ecclesiastical Academy alumni
Members of the Order of the Holy Sepulchre